Asterios Karagiannis (born 28 July 1986 in Dortmund) is a Greek footballer, who plays for Sportfreunde Baumberg.

Club career
Karagiannis played in the youth side for Borussia Dortmund, Schalke 04 and VfL Bochum.

After spending several years in VfL Bochum's reserve team, Karagiannis was signed in July 2005 by SF Oestrich Iserlohn, where he played three games in the 2006–07 season. He left after two years and on 27 July 2007, he signed with Landesliga Westfalen club SSV Hagen. He spent only a half-year, before joining Hasper SV in January 2008. Karagiannis played with his team Hasper SV the 2007–08 season to end and signed in July 2008 for Wuppertaler SV. He played in his first season with Wuppertaler SV's reserve team and made his senior debut on 28 November 2009 in a 3. Liga match against Carl Zeiss Jena as a substitute for Christoph Maly, after being sent off.

References

1986 births
Living people
Citizens of Greece through descent
Greek footballers
Greek expatriate footballers
German people of Greek descent
Sportspeople of Greek descent
Footballers from Dortmund
German footballers
Wuppertaler SV players
Association football goalkeepers
3. Liga players